Evgenios Ioannidis (born 12 January 2001) is a Greek chess International Master (2018).

Biography
Evgenios Ioannidis is multiple Greek Youth Chess Championships in different age groups (U08, U10).
Evgenios Ioannidis repeatedly represented Greece at the European Youth Chess Championships and World Youth Chess Championships in different age groups, where he won two gold medals: in 2011, at the European Youth Chess Championship in the U10 age group, and in 2018, at the European Youth Chess Championship in the U18 age group. In 2010, he won European School Chess Championship in the U11 age group. In 2016, he played for Greece in World Youth U16 Chess Olympiad. In 2017, in Uppsala he won the international youth chess tournament.

In 2018, Evgenios Ioannidis was awarded the FIDE International Master (IM) title.

References

External links

Evgenios Ioannidis chess games at 365Chess.com

2001 births
Living people
Greek chess players
Chess International Masters
21st-century Greek people